The 1965 All-Ireland Under-21 Hurling Championship was the second staging of the All-Ireland Under-21 Hurling Championship. The championship began on 28 March 1965 and ended on 12 September 1965.

Wexford won the title after defeating Tipperary 3-7 to 1-4 in the final.

Teams

A total of eighteen teams entered the under-21 championship, the same number as the previous year, however, there was a difference in the composition. In Munster, Kerry declined to field a team in spite of a spirited display against Galway the previous year. In Leinster, Carlow and Louth made way for Meath and Wicklow. An Ulster championship was organised for the first time, with Down joining provincial kingpins Antrim.

Team summaries

Results

Leinster Under-21 Hurling Championship

Final

Munster Under-21 Hurling Championship

Quarter-finals

Semi-finals

Final

Ulster Under-21 Hurling Championship

All-Ireland Under-21 Hurling Championship

References

Under-21
All-Ireland Under-21 Hurling Championship